Fort Hill State Memorial is a Native American earthwork located in Highland County, Ohio, United States. Built by the Hopewell culture, it is maintained by the Arc of Appalachia Preserve System and the Ohio History Connection.

The earthwork, built about 2,000 years ago, is a walled enclosure made of soil on top of a flat summit. It is  higher than nearby portions of Ohio Brush Creek and  higher than the Ohio River. It was made by the Hopewell people. It is over 1 miles in circumference, enclosing . Thirty-nine "man-made openings" occur throughout the enclosure: thirty-six that are verified as being made by Indians and three others still unknown as to how they were made. Archaeologists believe it was not used as a fort, but instead as a religious site.

In 1846, it was excavated by Ephraim George Squier and Edwin Hamilton Davis. It was featured in their book Ancient Monuments of the Mississippi Valley, which was published in 1848.

Fort Hill State Memorial contains excellent outcrops of Silurian, Devonian, and Mississippian sedimentary bedrock and a natural bridge. The site is also an example of glacial stream reversal.  It was named a National Natural Landmark in 1974.

Gallery

See also
Rocky Fork State Park
Paint Creek State Park

References

External links
Official website from Arc of Appalachia Preserve System
Fort Hill Earthworks & Nature Preserve - Ohio History Connection

1848 archaeological discoveries
State parks of Ohio
National Register of Historic Places in Highland County, Ohio
Protected areas of Highland County, Ohio
Ohio Hopewell
Archaeological sites on the National Register of Historic Places in Ohio
Ohio History Connection
National Natural Landmarks in Ohio
Museums in Highland County, Ohio
Native American museums in Ohio